This is a list of universities in Malaysia. Universities in Malaysia are generally categorised as public and private universities. Private universities include locally established universities and campuses of foreign universities.

The list below is classified by the two main categories, sequentially ordered by their locations according to states. For the purpose of this list, institutions of higher education that are authorised to confer their own degrees but do not have the status of universities are included under the sub-classification of university college (including institutions not classified as educational institutions under the Education Act 1996). Other institutions of higher education which do not have the authority to confer their degrees are listed in a separate article. There might be some duplication in both lists as some institutions provide both bodies regulate accredited training and education in multiple sectors.

In the case of institutions without official translations of their names in English or common used name by the local media, the translation provided by the Association of Commonwealth Universities is used, barring which the most common usage is provided.

Public universities and polytechnics 
Public universities in Malaysia are funded by the Government and are governed as self-managed institutions. Apart from the University of Malaya and the MARA University of Technology which were established by two separate enabling Acts of Parliament, the other public universities in Malaysia were created by executive order as per the provisions of the Universities and University Colleges Act 1971 [Act 30] (online version as at 1 August 2012). Until recently, the Ministry of Higher Education was responsible for seven institutions bearing the title "University College". These have since been upgraded to full universities, and there are currently no public university colleges.

For Polytechnics in Malaysia, it provides courses for bachelor's degree, Advanced Diploma, Diploma and Special Skills Certificate.

Private universities and university colleges 
The establishment of private universities and university colleges were made possible with the passage of the Private Higher Educational Institutions Act 1996 [Act 555] (Online version as at 1 December 2015). Before that, private institutions of higher learning existed but were not authorised to confer their own degrees. Instead, they acted as preparatory institutions for students to undertake courses of instructions in preparation for externally conferred degrees.

See also 
 Education in Malaysia
 List of post-secondary institutions in Malaysia
 Ministry of Higher Education
 Malaysian Qualifications Agency
 Malaysian Qualifications Framework
 Department of Skills Development
 Lists of universities and colleges by country

References

External links 
 Directory of Public University at Department of Higher Education (JPT)
 List of Private HEI Registration and Statistics at Department of Higher Education (JPT)
 Universities in Malaysia at UniDigest
 List of Top Private Universities in Malaysia at Uni Enrol
 Private Universities In Malaysia at Afterschool.my
 Universities in Malaysia at eTawau
 Study in Malaysia at EasyUni
 Full List of Universities in Malayisa at Malaysia University Portal

Universities
 
 
Malaysia
Malaysia